is a Japanese actress. Her husband was actor Masato Furuoya.

Filmography

Films

Direct-to-video

TV dramas

Other programmes

Bibliography

References

External links
Eri Kanuma's profile/photos/images - goo News 

Japanese actresses
People from Tokyo
1952 births
Living people